is a private junior college in Aoba-ku, Sendai, Japan. Founded as a school for practitioners in acupuncture and moxibustion in 1947, it was re-established as a junior college on August 29, 2017. A nursing department opened in 2018.

References

External links
 

Japanese junior colleges
Educational institutions established in 2018
Private universities and colleges in Japan
Universities and colleges in Miyagi Prefecture
Women's universities and colleges in Japan
2018 establishments in Japan